John Kay (1742 – 21 February 1826) was a Scottish caricaturist and engraver.

Life

John Kay was born in 1742 near Dalkeith, Scotland, where his father worked as a mason. At 13 he was apprenticed to a barber, whom he served for six years. He then went to Edinburgh, where in 1771 he obtained the freedom of the city by joining the corporation of barber-surgeons. In 1784 he published his first caricature, of Laird Robertson. In 1785, induced by the favour which greeted certain attempts of his to etch in aquafortis, he took down his barber's pole and opened a small print shop in Parliament Close. There he continued to flourish, painting miniatures, and publishing at short intervals his sketches and caricatures of local celebrities and oddities, who abounded at that period in Edinburgh society.

Kay's portraits were collected by Hugh Paton and published under the title A series of original portraits and caricature etchings by the late John Kay, with biographical sketches and illustrative anecdotes (Edinburgh, 2 vols. 4to, 1838; 8vo ed., 4 vols., 1842; new 4to ed., with additional plates, 2 vols., 1877), forming a unique record of the social life and popular habits of Edinburgh at its most interesting epoch. Kay's famous shop on the Royal Mile was destroyed during the Great Edinburgh Fire of November 1824. He died in Edinburgh and was buried at the north end of Greyfriars Kirkyard. The British Museum has extensive holdings of his works, including two albums apparently assembled by Kay, both described in the Catalogue of Political and Personal Satires Preserved in the Department of Prints and Drawings in the British Museum

Some persons caricatured by Kay
 Hugo Arnot
 Joseph Black
 Hugh Blair
 Claud Irvine Boswell
 John Brown
 James Burnett, Lord Monboddo
 Charles Byrne
 Alexander Carlyle
 James Donaldson
 Henry Dundas, 1st Viscount Melville
 Robert Dundas, 2nd Viscount Melville
 Alexander Gerard
 Alexander Gordon, Lord Rockville
 John Grieve (Lord Provost)
 William "Spread Eagle" Grinly
 Francis Grose
 Henry Home, Lord Kames
 Sir Archibald Hope, 9th Baronet
 John Hope
 James Hutton
 Thomas Jefferson
 Vincenzo Lunardi
 Sam McDonald
 William Nairne, Lord Dunsinane
 William Robertson
 Sarah Siddons
 Adam Smith
 Peter Williamson (Indian Peter)
 Alexander ("Lang Sandy") Wood

References

Further reading
 Evans, Hilary & Evans, Mary (1981), John Kay of Edinburgh, Paul Harris, 
 Moffat. Sandy (1981), review of John Kay of Edinburgh by Hilary & Mary Evans, in Murray, Glen (ed.), Cencrastus No.6, Autumn 1981, pp. 43 & 44

External links

 The complete two volumes of John Kay's Originals with searchable text and images and Volume 2
 John Kay (Deutsche Biographie)

1742 births
1826 deaths
People from Midlothian
18th-century engravers
19th-century engravers
19th-century Scottish male artists
Scottish caricaturists
Scottish engravers
Burials at Greyfriars Kirkyard